Sergeant James Hubert Ronald Green (7 February 1897 – 15 December 1917) was a World War I flying ace credited with six aerial victories.

Early life
Green was born on 7 February 1897 in Buckland, Berkshire, the son of Walter and Annie Louisa Green; his father was a groom.

Death
Green was killed in a flying accident near Norwich on 15 December 1917. He was buried at Abingdon, Berkshire.

References

1897 births
1917 deaths
British World War I flying aces
People from Vale of White Horse (district)
Royal Flying Corps soldiers
Recipients of the Silver Medal of Military Valor
Aviators killed in aviation accidents or incidents in England
People from Buckland, Oxfordshire
British military personnel killed in World War I